Grewia sely is a species of flowering plant in the family Malvaceae, native to Madagascar. It is known from only two locations on the island, and is critically endangered.

Description
Grewia sely is a small shrub, growing up to 3 meters tall. It can be distinguished from the other members of its genus growing on Madagascar by its leaves, which are not acuminate at their apices.

Range and habitat
Grewia sely is known from only two locations, 1395 km apart, in northern Sava Region at the northern end of the island, and Anosy region at Madagascar's southern end.

It is found in dry deciduous forest on lateritic soils near the coast, between sea level and 28 meters elevation.

Conservation and threats
The two subpopulations are severely fragmented, and are genetically isolated. The species is threatened with habitat loss from shifting cultivation and conversion to agriculture. The northern subpopulation occurs in Loky-Manambato protected area. Its conservation status is assessed as critically endangered.

References

sely
Endemic flora of Madagascar
Plants described in 1917
Flora of the Madagascar dry deciduous forests